Xiaomi 11T and Xiaomi 11T Pro are Android-based smartphones manufactured by Xiaomi. The main feature of Xiaomi 11T Pro is 120W fast charging.

Design 
Front of smartphones made of Corning Gorilla Glass Victus. Back made of unknown glass. Frame made of aluminium and covered by plastic.

The design of Xiaomi 11T series is something average between Redmi K40 and Mi 11 Ultra.

On the bottom side, there are USB-C port, speaker, microphone and dual SIM tray. On the top side additional microphone, IR blaster and second speaker. On the right side there are volume rocker and power button with mounted fingerprint scanner.

References

External links 

 
 

Android (operating system) devices
Mobile phones with multiple rear cameras
Mobile phones with 8K video recording
Mobile phones with infrared transmitter
Mobile phones introduced in 2021
Phablets
Flagship smartphones
11T